If You Want Me is the final solo studio album recorded by R&B and Gospel singer Carolyn Franklin (sister of Aretha Franklin) for RCA Records, in 1976. Reissued on CD by Big Break Records in 2014.

Track listing

Side One
"From the Bottom of My Heart (To the Bottom of Yours)" (Carolyn Franklin, Pearl Jones) - 2:28
"If You Want Me" (Carolyn Franklin, Jimmy Radcliffe) - 2:53
"I Can't Help Myself Feeling So Blue" (Jillean Williams, Wade Marcus) - 5:35
"Too Many Roads" (Carolyn Franklin, Sonny Sanders) - 3:00
"Sunshine Holiday" (Pearl Jones, Sonny Sanders) - 2:08
"Dead Man" (Carolyn Franklin, Val Benson, Wade Marcus) - 2:53

Side Two
"You Are Everything" (Thom Bell, Linda Creed) - 2:39
"You Can Have My Soul" (Pearl Jones, Sonny Sanders) - 3:54
"Soul Man" (Ernie Cate, Earl Cate, Wade Marcus) - 2:59
"Not Enough to Hold" (Carolyn Franklin, Sonny Sanders) - 3:00
"Deal with It" (Carolyn Franklin, Pearl Jones) - 3:20

Personnel
Carolyn Franklin - vocals
Jimmy Radcliffe - producer, arranger, conductor
Wade Marcus - arranger, conductor
Sonny Sanders - arranger, conductor
Ivy Jo Hunter - assistant producer
Paul Goodman - recording engineer
David H. Hecht, Nick Sangiamo - photography

External links
 

1976 albums
Albums arranged by Wade Marcus
RCA Records albums